Three destroyers of the Imperial Japanese Navy have been named :

 , lead ship of the s of the Imperial Japanese Navy during the Russo-Japanese War
 , lead ship of the Yamabiko class of destroyers of the Imperial Japanese Navy during the Russo-Japanese War, formerly the Russian destroyer Reshitelny

See also
 Akatsuki (disambiguation)
 
 , a  launched in 2020 for the Japan Coast Guard

Japanese Navy ship names
Imperial Japanese Navy ship names